Andhrudu is a 2005 Indian Telugu-language action drama film produced by ML Kumar Chowdary on  Sri Keerthi Creations banner and directed by Paruchuri Murali. Starring Gopichand, Gowri Pandit  and music composed by Kalyani Malik. The film was successful at the box office. The film was also dubbed into Tamil as Ivanthanda Police and into Hindi as Loha: The Ironman. The film was remade in Bengali Bangladesh as Prem Mane Na Badha and in Tamil as Konjam Sirippu Konjam Kobam.

Plot 
Surendra (Gopichand) is an honest and hot-blooded cop. Archana (Gowri Pandit) is the daughter of a police commissioner. They meet accidentally, and their relationship blossoms into love. Archana's father is of Bihar origin. Parents settle the match of Surendra and Archana. When they are about to get engaged, Surendra expresses his reservations due to Archana overhearing her father's conversation with his long-estranged sister on the subject of Archana and her cousin Sinha (Salim Baig) marrying. Surendra takes the blame for the destroyed relationship, and Archana goes to Bihar to wed Sinha. The rest of the story is all about how Surendra goes to Bihar and wins Archana back.

Cast

 Gopichand as Surendra
 Gowri Pandit as Archana
 Salim Baig as Munna
 K. Viswanath as Viswanatha Sastry
 Pawan Malhotra as Commissioner Ranveer Sinha
 Sayaji Shinde as Rana, MP
 Dharmavarapu Subramanyam as CI
 Pruthvi Raj as ACP
 Sunil as Thief
 Haritha as Archana's mother
 Sudeepa Pinky as Archana's sister
 Ravi Babu as Thief
 Lakshmipathi as Thief
 Duvvasi Mohan as Constable
 Vinaya Prasad as Munna's mother
 Gundu Sudarshan
 Master Deepak as Chintu

Soundtrack

Music composed by Kalyan Koduri. Music released on ADITYA Music Company.

Awards
Sunil won Nandi Award for Best Male Comedian for his excellent comic role in this film.

References

External links
 

2000s Telugu-language films
2005 action films
Films set in Bihar
Films shot in Bihar
Indian action films
Telugu films remade in other languages